Kaunas Central Post Office is a post office in Kaunas, Lithuania, which is one of the most notable buildings from the period when Kaunas was the temporary capital of Lithuania.

Gallery

References

Buildings and structures in Kaunas
Commercial buildings completed in 1932
1932 establishments in Lithuania